Pál Szekeres (born 22 September 1964) is a retired Hungarian foil and sabre fencer. He has the distinction of being the first person to have won medals at both the Olympic and Paralympic Games.

Career in sport
Szekeres represented Hungary at the 1988 Summer Olympics in Seoul, and won a bronze medal in the team foil event.

In 1991, he was injured in a bus accident, and used a wheelchair. He then took to wheelchair fencing. Described as "the most successful Paralympic athlete in Hungary", he won a gold medal in foil at the 1992 Summer Paralympics in Barcelona, two gold at the 1996 Games in Atlanta, a bronze in 2000, 2004, and 2008. Outside the Paralympic Games, Szekeres participated in the Wheelchair Fencing World Cup in 2006, winning a bronze medal in the individual sabre event. He has also been European Champion, notably winning gold in the individual sabre event at the European Championships in 2007. In 2008 he was ranked third in the world.

Career in government and administration
From 1999 to 2005, Szekeres was deputy state secretary within the Ministry of Children, Youth and Sports. He was also Ministerial Commissioner and Senior Programme Officer tasked with a government programme to provide "equal opportunity through sport for people living with disabilities". From 1996 to 2000, he was a member of the Presidency of the International Wheelchair Fencing Committee. From 2001 to 2005, he was "member at large" of the European Paralympic Committee, working in administration. In 2005, he became President of the Hungarian Sports Federation for the Disabled. , Szekeres was a member of the Executive Committee of the National Paralympic Committee of Hungary, and was participating in the organising of the International Paralympic Sport Film Festival.

Szekeres has a university degree in physical education as a coach, and also holds a degree in marketing communication.

See also
List of athletes who have competed in the Paralympics and Olympics

References

External links
 

1964 births
Living people
Hungarian male foil fencers
Olympic fencers of Hungary
Fencers at the 1988 Summer Olympics
Olympic bronze medalists for Hungary
Olympic medalists in fencing
Paralympic wheelchair fencers of Hungary
Wheelchair fencers at the 1992 Summer Paralympics
Wheelchair fencers at the 1996 Summer Paralympics
Wheelchair fencers at the 2000 Summer Paralympics
Wheelchair fencers at the 2004 Summer Paralympics
Wheelchair fencers at the 2008 Summer Paralympics
Paralympic gold medalists for Hungary
Paralympic bronze medalists for Hungary
Wheelchair fencers at the 2012 Summer Paralympics
Medalists at the 1988 Summer Olympics
Medalists at the 1992 Summer Paralympics
Medalists at the 1996 Summer Paralympics
Medalists at the 2000 Summer Paralympics
Medalists at the 2004 Summer Paralympics
Medalists at the 2008 Summer Paralympics
Universiade medalists in fencing
Universiade bronze medalists for Hungary
Paralympic medalists in wheelchair fencing
Medalists at the 1987 Summer Universiade
Hungarian male sabre fencers
Fencers from Budapest